Sophie Desmarets (1922–2012) was a French film actress.

Selected filmography

 Battement de coeur (1940) - (uncredited)
 Premier rendez-vous (1941) - Henriette Lefranc
 L'homme qui joue avec le feu (1942) - Gabrielle
 Des jeunes filles dans la nuit (1943) - Louise
 Seul dans la nuit (1945) - Thérèse
 120, rue de la Gare (1946) - Hélène Chatelain
 The Captain (1946) - Marion Delorme
 Third at Heart (1947) - Gaby
 The Revenge of Baccarat (1947) - La comtesse Artoff dite 'Baccarat'
 Woman Without a Past (1948) - Caroline
 Cruise for the Unknown One (1948) - Marianne Fabre
 Les souvenirs ne sont pas à vendre (1948) - Brigitte
 Night Express (1948) - Simone
 Vire-vent (1949) - Claire Donadieu
 La veuve et l'innocent (1949) - Nicole - l'avocate
 The King (1949) - Mme Youyou Bourdier
 My Friend Sainfoin (1950) - Eugénie
 Just Me (1950) - Caroline Peuchat
 Le Sabre de mon père - (1951) - Françoise Dujardin
 Demain nous divorçons (1951) - Colette Blanchet
 Rome-Paris-Rome (1951) - Ginette
 My Wife Is Formidable (1951) - Sylvia Corbier
 My Husband Is Marvelous (1952) - Sylvia Corbier
 Women of Paris (1953) - Elle-même (uncredited)
 Service Entrance (1954) - Madame Dumény
 Scènes de ménage (1954) - Aglaë
 Caroline and the Rebels (1955) - Duchesse Laure d'Albuquerque
 The Last Five Minutes (1955) - La duchessa Isabella Camporese
 Une fille épatante (1955) - Dominique Laugier
 If Paris Were Told to Us (1956) - Rose Bertin
 Le secret de soeur Angèle (1956) - Soeur Angèle
 Ces sacrées vacances (1956) - Claudette Pinson
 Ce soir les jupons volent (1956) - Marlène
 Miss Catastrophe (1957) - Elvire Mercier
 Les 3 font la paire (1957) - Titine
 Fumée blonde (1957) - Sophie Mallet
 Filous et compagnie (1957) - Marianne
 Life Together (1958) - Marguerite Caboufigue
 Madame et son auto (1958) - Sophie Dirondel
 Nina (1959) - Nina Tessier
 Drôles de phénomènes (1959) - Aline Chantour
 Love and the Frenchwoman (1960) - Lucienne, Bichette's mother (segment "Adolescence, L'")
 Anonima cocottes (1960)
 The Fenouillard Family (1960) - Léocadie Fanouillard
 La ragazza di mille mesi (1961) - Armanzia
 Le motorizzate (1963) - The Lady Driver (segment "La Signora Ci Marcia")
 Sweet and Sour (1963) - Lulu la pianiste
 La foire aux cancres (Chronique d'une année scolaire) (1963) - Mme Sigoules
 La chance et l'amour (1964) - Léa Anders (segment "Lucky la chance")
 Cent briques et des tuiles (1965)
 La tête du client (1965) - Françoise Berrien
 All Mad About Him (1967) - Hélène Maccard
 Atlantic Wall (1970) - Maria Duchemin
 La raison du plus fou (1973) - La préripatéticienne
 Le maestro (1977) - Germaine Bourgeon
 Un second souffle (1978) - Louise Davis
 Les mamies (1992) - Simone
 Pourquoi maman est dans mon lit? (1994) - Mamie Jeanne
 Fantôme avec chauffeur (1996) - Delphine, la parente kleptomane
 Fallait pas!... (1996) - Constance's Mother (final film role)

References

Bibliography
 Davis, Ronald L. Hollywood Beauty: Linda Darnell and the American Dream. University of Oklahoma Press, 2014.

External links

1922 births
2012 deaths
French film actresses
French television actresses
Actresses from Paris
French National Academy of Dramatic Arts alumni
Commandeurs of the Ordre des Arts et des Lettres
Burials at Montparnasse Cemetery